Jillian Michaels (born February 18, 1974) is an American personal trainer, businesswoman, author, and television personality from Los Angeles, California. Michaels is best known for her appearances on NBC, particularly The Biggest Loser. She has also made an appearance on the talk show The Doctors. In fall 2015, she hosted and co-judged a series on Spike titled Sweat, INC. In January 2016, her reality television series Just Jillian premiered on E!.

Early life
Michaels was born in Los Angeles, California, the daughter of JoAnn, a psychotherapist, and Douglas McKarus, a lawyer. She was raised in Tarzana.

Michaels attended California State University, Northridge, supporting herself as a bartender and personal trainer during that time. After working briefly as an agent with International Creative Management, in 2002, Michaels opened the sports medicine facility Sky Sport & Spa in Beverly Hills.

Career
As a personal trainer and black belt holder, Michaels uses a blend of strength training techniques with her clients including kickboxing, yoga, Pilates, plyometrics, and weight training. Since 1993, Michaels has held four personal training certificates from the National Exercise & Sports Trainers Association NESTA and The Aerobics and Fitness Association of America (AFAA), CanFitPro and she is Kettlebell Concepts certified. Michaels has also developed a continuing education series for trainers with AFAA and holds a nutrition and wellness consultant certificate with the American Fitness Professionals and Associates (AFPA).

Media

Jillian Michaels: The Fitness App is one of the top fitness apps globally and has won awards from both Apple and Google for best of in health and fitness app category. Michaels has also released 20 fitness DVDs that have sold over 100 million copies worldwide. Michaels has also authored 9 books on health and wellness topics with 8 NY Times Best Sellers New York Times Best Seller list.

Since February 2011, Michaels has hosted a weekly podcast, The Jillian Michaels Show, through iTunes. In December 2011, the show was among the podcasts honored by Apple in its App Store Rewind 2011, winning in the Best New Audio Podcast category.

Michaels launched her company Empowered Media LLC in 2008 and released her fitness video membership website called Fitfusion.com. Fitfusion is also associated and broadcasts on AT&T U-verse, BroadbandTV Corp, Bell Satellite TV Canada, and other TV channels, as well as Roku, Apple TV, and Fitness on Demand reaching audiences in Marriott, Hilton Worldwide and Shangri-La Hotels and Resorts.

The Biggest Loser
Michaels was a trainer on the reality series The Biggest Loser when the show started in October 2004. On the show, she assumed the role of Red Team trainer and remained in that capacity for the first two seasons. After her departure in 2006, she was replaced by Kim Lyons. She returned to the show in 2007 as the Black Team trainer competing against Lyons' Red Team and Bob Harper's Blue Team. Along with Harper, Michaels was also a trainer in the Australian version of the show from 2006 to 2008.

On December 7, 2010, Michaels announced via Twitter that the eleventh season of the show would be her last. Michaels made her last appearance on The Biggest Loser on May 24, 2011.

On September 4, 2012, it was announced that Michaels will return to The Biggest Loser in Season 14. Michaels also returned for Season 15, which premiered on October 15, 2013, on NBC, but did not return for Season 16 which aired in the fall of 2014.

Losing It With Jillian
On June 1, 2010, NBC debuted Losing It With Jillian, a spin-off of The Biggest Loser. In the show, Michaels visits the home and workplaces of family members for a week.

Losing It With Jillian originally ran on NBC in June and July 2010. As of January 2012, all eight episodes of the series are available for viewing online.

Contract with CBS Television Distribution

On May 6, 2011, CBS Television Distribution announced that Michaels had signed a multi-year deal to become a co-host of the panel-discussion show The Doctors, as well as to serve as a special correspondent on the CTD program Dr. Phil. Michaels had been a guest on The Doctors several times previously. On the show, Michaels hosted a recurring segment called Ask Jillian, which dealt primarily with nutrition and diet topics.

Michaels left The Doctors in January 2012 after half a season, because, she said, the arrangement "wasn't the fit both the show and I hoped for".

Charities
Michaels works with a variety of charities including the UNHCR. Michaels is involved in a variety of charities including the NFL's Play 60, Stand Up to Cancer, Working Wardrobes, Hope for Haiti, and Sow a Seed and Dress for Success. Michaels also devotes time to animal welfare causes, and she recently helped PETA rescue a racehorse from the slaughterhouse.

Personal life
Michaels has two children with her ex-fiancée Heidi Rhoades. Michaels adopted their then-two-year-old daughter from Haiti in May 2012, and Rhoades gave birth to a son that same month. The couple announced the end of their relationship in June 2018.

As of late 2018 Michaels has been in a relationship with designer Deshanna Marie Minuto. In November 2021, Michaels announced that she and Minuto were engaged.

On her sexuality, Michaels has stated, "Let's just say I believe in healthy love. If I fall in love with a woman, that's awesome. If I fall in love with a man, that's awesome. As long as you fall in love...it's like organic food. I only eat healthy food, and I only want healthy love!" She credits Madonna's "Justify My Love" video with helping her find her voice.

In September 2020, Michaels told Fox Business that she had recently recovered from COVID-19. She said that she was "able to get on the other side of it pretty quick."

Bibliography
 Winning by Losing: Drop the Weight, Change Your Life (September 2005), William Morrow, 
 Making the Cut: The 30-Day Diet and Fitness Plan for the Strongest, Sexiest You (April 2007), Harmony Books, 
 Master Your Metabolism: The 3 Diet Secrets to Naturally Balancing Your Hormones for a Hot and Healthy Body! (April 2009), Crown, 
 The Master Your Metabolism Calorie Counter (April 2010), Three Rivers Press, 
 The Master Your Metabolism Cookbook (April 2010), Harmony Books, 
 Unlimited: How to Build an Exceptional Life (April 2011), Harmony Books, 
 Slim for Life: My Insider Secrets to Simple, Fast, and Lasting Weight Loss (April 2013), Harmony Books, 
 Yeah Baby!: The Modern Mama's Guide to Mastering Pregnancy, Having a Healthy Baby, and Bouncing Back Better Than Ever (November 2016), Rodale Books, 
 The 6 Keys: Unlock Your Genetic Potential for Ageless Strength, Health and Beauty (December 2018), Little Brown,

References

External links

 
 

 
 

1974 births
Living people
21st-century American businesspeople
21st-century American businesswomen
21st-century American women writers
American exercise and fitness writers
American exercise instructors
American podcasters
American sports businesspeople
American talent agents
American television talk show hosts
American video game designers
American women philanthropists
American women podcasters
American women television personalities
Businesspeople from Los Angeles
California State University, Northridge alumni
Diet food advocates
American LGBT broadcasters
LGBT people from California
American LGBT sportspeople
Participants in American reality television series
Philanthropists from California
Sportspeople from Los Angeles
Writers from Los Angeles